Penang Hokkien (Tâi-lô: Pin-siânn Hok-kiàn-uā;) is a local variant of Hokkien spoken in Penang, Malaysia. It is spoken natively by 63.9% of Penang's Chinese community, and also by some Penangite Indians and Penangite Malays.

It was once the lingua franca among the majority Chinese population in Penang, Kedah, Perlis and northern Perak. However, since the 1980s, many young speakers have shifted towards Malaysian Mandarin, under the Speak Mandarin Campaign in Chinese-medium schools in Malaysia, even though Mandarin was not previously spoken in these regions. Mandarin has been adopted as the only language of instruction in Chinese schools and, from the 1980s to mid-2010s, the schools had rules to penalize students and teachers for using non-Mandarin varieties of Chinese.

Penang Hokkien is a subdialect of Zhangzhou (漳州; Tsiang-tsiu) Chinese, with widespread use of Malay and English loanwords. Compared to dialects in Fujian (福建; Hok-kiàn) province, it most closely resembles the variety spoken in the district of Haicang (海滄; Hái-tshng) in Longhai (龍海; Liông-hái) county and in the districts of Jiaomei (角美; Kak-bí) and Xinglin (杏林; Hēng-lîm) in neighbouring Xiamen (廈門; Ēe-muî) prefecture. In Southeast Asia, similar dialects are spoken in the states bordering Penang (Kedah, Perlis and northern Perak), as well as in Medan and North Sumatra, Indonesia. It is markedly distinct from Southern Peninsular Malaysian Hokkien and Taiwanese Hokkien.

Orthography
Penang Hokkien is largely a spoken language: it is rarely written in Chinese characters, and there is no official standard romanisation. In recent years, there has been a growing body of romanised Penang Hokkien material; however, topics are mostly limited to the language itself such as dictionaries and learning materials. This is linked to efforts to preserve, revitalise and promote the language as part of Penang's cultural heritage, due to increasing awareness of the loss of Penang Hokkien usage among younger generations in favour of Mandarin and English. The standard romanisation systems commonly used in these materials are based on Tâi-lô (TL) and Pe̍h-ōe-jī (POJ), with varying modifications to suit Penang Hokkien phonology.

The Hokkien Language Association of Penang (Persatuan Bahasa Hokkien Pulau Pinang; 庇能福建話協會) is one such organisation which promotes the language's usage and revitalisation. Through their Speak Hokkien Campaign they promote a Tâi-lô based system modified to suit the phonology of Penang Hokkien and its loanwords. This system is used throughout this article and its features are detailed below.

The Speak Hokkien Campaign also promotes the use of traditional Chinese characters derived from recommended character lists for written Hokkien published by Taiwan's Ministry of Education.

Most native-speakers are not aware of these standardised systems and resort to ad hoc methods of romanisation based on English, Malay and Pinyin spelling rules. These methods are in common use for many proper names and food items, e.g. Char Kway Teow (炒粿條 tshá-kúe-tiâu). These spellings are often inconsistent and highly variable with several alternate spellings being well established, e.g. Char Koay Teow. These methods, which are more intuitive to the average native-speaker, are the basis of non-standard romanisation systems used in some written material.

Phonology

Consonants

 Unlike other dialects of Hokkien, alveolar affricates and fricatives remain the same and do not undergo palatalization to become alveolo-palatal before /i/, e.g. 時 [si] instead of [ɕi].
 Words that begin with a null initial, i.e. begin with a vowel without a preceding consonant may feature an initial glottal stop /ʔ/, this is not indicated in writing.

Vowels

 In the Tâi-lô system for Penang Hokkien, nasal vowels are indicated using final , while Pe̍h-ōe-jī uses superscript . This is commonly seen for the popular Penang delicacy Tau Sar Pneah (豆沙餅; tāu-sa-piánn). In other instances, nasalisation may not be indicated at all, such as in Popiah (薄餅; po̍h-piánn), or as in the common last name Ooi (黃; Uînn).
 The final  is only written in conjunction with words that have an initial , e.g. 娘 niôo.
The two may be used interchangeably in Penang Hokkien, e.g. 張 tiaunn/tionn, 羊 iâunn/iônn.
 The diphthong /ua/ may be spelled  in loanwords, e.g. 我 wá/uá.
 The diphthong /ia/ may be spelled  in loanwords, e.g. sa-yang/sa-iang 捎央.

Rhymes

  * Used in loanwords, variants and onomatopoeia

Tones
In Penang Hokkien, the two Departing tones (3rd & 7th) are virtually identical, and may not be distinguished except in their sandhi forms. Most native speakers of Penang Hokkien are therefore only aware of four tones in unchecked syllables (high, low, rising, high falling), and two Entering tones (high and low) in checked syllables. In most systems of romanisation, this is accounted as seven tones altogether. The tones are:

The names of the tones no longer bear any relation to the tone contours. The (upper) Rising (2nd) tone has two variants in Penang Hokkien, a high falling tone [˥˧] (53) and a high rising tone [˦˦˥] (445). The high falling tone [˥˧] (53) is more common among the older generations while in the younger generations there has been a shift towards the use of the high rising tone [˦˦˥] (445). When the 3rd tone is sandhied to the 2nd tone, the high falling variant [˥˧] (53) is used, however some speakers may sandhi the 3rd tone to the 1st tone [˦] (44). As in Amoy and Zhangzhou, there is no lower Rising (6th) tone.

Tone sandhi
Penang Hokkien, like other Hokkien dialects albeit less extensive, features tone sandhi (變調; piàn-tiāu), a process where the tone of a character changes if it is followed by another character as part of a multisyllabic compound. When a character is read in isolation as a monosyllabic word, or as the final character in a multisyllabic compound, it is pronounced with its "original tone" (本調; pún-tiāu). Within a multisyllabic compound, every character, except for the one in the final position undergoes tone sandhi. For example, the word 牛 gû in isolation is pronounced with an ascending tone, [˨˧] (23), but when it combines with a following syllable, as in 牛肉 gû-bah, it undergoes tone sandhi and is pronounced with a low tone, [˨˩] (21). Meanwhile 肉 bah in the final position is pronounced with its original tone [ʔ˧] (3). This process occurs regardless of the length of the compound, for example, in 牛肉粿條湯 gû-bah-kué-tiâu-thng, the first 4 characters are pronounced with their sandhied tone, while only the final character 湯 thng, is pronounced with its original tone.

In both Tâi-lô and Pe̍h-ōe-jī based romanisation systems, compounds are indicated with the use of hyphens linking the individual syllables. Single hyphens (-) are most often used and linked syllables undergo tone sandhi as described above. Double hyphens (--) are used in instances where the preceding syllable does not undergo tone sandhi. Tone marks always show the original tone, and do not change to indicate the sandhied tone in a compound.

The general tone sandhi rules for Penang Hokkien are as follows:
 5th becomes 7th
 7th becomes 3rd
 3rd becomes 2nd (for some speakers becomes 1st)
 2nd becomes 1st
 1st becomes 7th

Checked syllables (-p, -t, -k, -h):
 4th becomes 8th
 8th becomes 4th

Although the two departing tones (3rd & 7th) are virtually identical in Penang Hokkien, in their sandhi forms they become [˥˧] (53) and [˨˩] (21) and are thus easily distinguishable.

Relationship between Hokkien and Mandarin tones
There is a reasonably reliable correspondence between Hokkien and Mandarin tones:

 Upper Level: Hokkien 1st tone = Mandarin 1st tone, e.g. 雞 ke/jī.
 Lower Level: Hokkien 5th tone = Mandarin 2nd tone, e.g. 龍 lêng/lóng.
 Rising: Hokkien 2nd tone = Mandarin 3rd tone, e.g. 馬 bée/mǎ.
 Departing: Hokkien 3rd/7th tones = Mandarin 4th tone, e.g. 兔 thòo/tù, 象 tshiōnn/xiàng.

As Mandarin no longer has any Entering tones, there is no simple corresponding relationship for the Hokkien 4th and 8th tones, e.g. 國 kok/guó, but 發 huat/fā. The tone in Mandarin often depends on what the initial consonant of the syllable is (see the article on Entering tones for details).

Literary and colloquial pronunciations
Hokkien has not been taught in schools in Penang since the establishment of the Republic of China in 1911, when Mandarin was made the Chinese national language. As such, few if any people have received any formal instruction in Hokkien, and it is not used for literary purposes. However, as in other variants of Min Nan, most words have both literary and colloquial pronunciations. Literary variants are generally eschewed in favour of colloquial pronunciations, e.g. 大學 tuā-o̍h instead of tāi-ha̍k, though literary pronunciations still appear in limited circumstances, e.g.:

 in a few surnames, e.g. 葉 ia̍p rather than hio̍h
 in other proper names, e.g. 龍山堂 Liông-san-tông rather than Lêng-suann-tn̂g
 in certain set phrases, e.g. 差不多 tsha-put-to rather than tshee-m̄-to, 見笑 kiàn-siàu rather than kìnn-tshiò
 in certain names of plants, herbs, and spices, e.g. 木瓜 bo̍k-kua rather than ba̍k-kua, 五香 ngóo-hiong rather than gōo-hiong
 in names of certain professions, eg. 學生 ha̍k-seng instead of o̍h-senn, 醫生 i-seng rather than i-senn, and 老君 ló-kun instead of lāu-kun. A notable exception is 先生 sin-senn

Unlike in China, Taiwan, and the Philippines, the literary pronunciations of numbers higher than two are not used when giving telephone numbers, etc.; e.g. 二五四 jī-gōo-sì instead of jī-ngóo-sù.

Differences from other varieties of Hokkien
Penang Hokkien has differences in pronunciation and vocabulary when compared to other varieties of Hokkien. Although Penang Hokkien has many similarities to Zhangzhou Hokkien from which it is derived, it also has its own unique differences.

 The use of Zhangzhou pronunciations such as 糜 muâi (Amoy: bê), 先生 sin-senn (Amoy: sian-sinn), etc.;
 The use of Zhangzhou expressions such as 調羹 thâu-kiong (Amoy: 湯匙 thng-sî);
 The adoption of pronunciations from Teochew: e.g. 我 uá (Zhangzhou: guá), 糜 môi (Zhangzhou: muâi);
 The adoption of Amoy and Quanzhou pronunciations like 歹勢 pháinn-sè (Zhangzhou: bái/pháinn-sì), 百 pah (Zhangzhou: peeh), etc.

General pronunciation differences can be shown as below:

Loanwords
Due to Penang's linguistic and ethnic diversity, Penang Hokkien is in close contact with many other languages and dialects which are drawn on heavily for loanwords. These include Malay, Teochew, Cantonese and English.

Malay
Like other dialects in Malaysia and Singapore, Penang Hokkien borrows heavily from Malay, but sometimes to a greater extent than other Hokkien dialects, e.g.:

There are also many Hokkien words which have been borrowed into Malay, sometimes with slightly different meanings, e.g.:

Other Chinese varieties
There are words in Penang Hokkien that originated from other varieties of Chinese spoken in and around Malaysia. e.g.:

English
Penang Hokkien has also borrowed some words from English, some of which may have been borrowed via Malay. Often, these words tend to be more technical and less well embedded than the Malay words, e.g. brake, park, pipe, pump, etc. However some are used in common everyday language, e.g.:

Thai
Penang Hokkien also contains words which are thought to come from Thai, e.g.:

Entertainment 
In recent years, a number of movies that incorporate the use of Penang Hokkien have been filmed, as part of wider efforts to preserve the dialect's relevance. Among the more recent movies are The Journey, which became the highest-grossing Malaysian film in 2014, and You Mean the World to Me, the first movie to be filmed entirely in Penang Hokkien.

See also 
 Hoklo people
 Hokkien culture
 Hokkien architecture
 Written Hokkien
 Hokkien media
 Taiwanese Hokkien
 Southern Malaysia Hokkien
 Singaporean Hokkien
 Medan Hokkien
 Lan-nang-oe (Philippine Hokkien)
 Place and street names of Penang
 Written Hokkien
 Speak Hokkien Campaign
 Penang Hokkien Podcast

Notes

References

Further reading 
 , bound with 
 

Chinese-Malaysian culture
Languages of Malaysia
Hokkien-language dialects
Penang